Jorge Coste can refer to:

 Jorge Coste (footballer) (born 1988), Mexican footballer
 Jorge Coste (water polo) (born 1959), Mexican water polo player